Chalk Level may refer to:

Chalk Level, Missouri
Chalk Level, Virginia